LP is the fifth studio album by American indie-folk, gypsy-punk group Insomniac Folklore. It was recorded by Mike Alston at Sound Ghost Studios in Portland, Oregon, during the fall and winter of 2009. Additional songs were recorded at PMC by Tyler Hentschel.

The album art was created by gothic comic book artist Foo Swee Chin.

Bradley Hathaway guested with the band doing spoken word on the opening track "Kid and Snail".

Grace Notes described LP as "Likable indie folk with subtle punk roots and clever songwriting"

Track listing

Personnel 
 Insomniac Folklore
 Tyler Hentschel – Vocals, guitar, organ, lyricist, composer, songwriter
 John David Van Beek – Accordion
 Danielle Maes – Violin
 Ayden Simonatti – Drums
 Dennis Childers – Bass
 Zoe Simonatti – Backing vocals
 Anavah Simonatti – backing vocals

 Additional personnel
 Bradley Hathaway – Spoken word
 Kat Jones – Vocals
 Ricardo Alessio – Ironing board
 Jason Maes – Trumpet

References 

2010 albums
Insomniac Folklore albums